Textile schools in Bangladesh offer various academic and professional degrees in textile fields. A number of colleges and technical institutes as well as some universities offer diploma, bachelor's and master's degree from their allocated faculties upon completion of certification courses. Textile courses offered in these schools include spinning, weaving, knitting, dyeing, printing, finishing, apparels merchandising and fashion designing. , textile material is the largest export item of Bangladesh. Bangladesh exported $42.35 billion worth of readymade garments in the 2018–2019 fiscal year.

Public textile educational institutions
Bangladesh University of Textiles (BUTEX); The first and only textile engineering centric public university in Bangladesh. It functions as the mother institution for countrywide public institutes of technology which emphasise primarily on textiles education regarding research and advancement.
Dhaka University of Engineering and Technology (DUET)
Khulna University of Engineering and Technology (KUET)
Mawlana Bhashani Science and Technology University
Jashore University of Science and Technology
Shaheed Abdur Rab Textile Engineering College, Barishal, Affiliated with BUTEX.
Sheikh Kamal Textile Engineering College, Jhenaidah, Affiliated with BUTEX.
Dr. M. A. Wazed Ali Miah Textile Engineering College, Rangpur, Affiliated with BUTEX.
Bangabandhu Textile Engineering College, Tangail, Affiliated with BUTEX.
Chittagong Textile Engineering College, Chittagong, Affiliated with BUTEX.
Begumganj Textile Engineering College, Noakhali, Affiliated with BUTEX.
Pabna Textile Engineering College, Pabna, Affiliated with BUTEX.
Bangladesh Handloom Education and Training Institute, Narshingdi,  Affiliated with BUTEX.
Sheikh Rehana Textile Engineering College, Gopalgonj (On Going Project)
Sheikh Hasina Textile Engineering College, Jamalpur (On Going Project)
Sheikh Russel Textile Engineering College, Sylhet (On Going Project)
Sheikh Hasina Textile Engineering College, Shibchor (Waiting for Govt. Approval)
Kapasia Textile Engineering College, Gazipur (Project In Process)
Shaheed Syed Nazrul Islam Textile Engineering College, Kishoregonj (Project In Process)

Public-private partnerships
 National Institute of Textile Engineering and Research (NITER) : An affiliated institute of technology of University of Dhaka, offering research based textiles education in both undergraduate and postgraduate levels. It used to be considered as the second with its rank among its kind in the region. Formerly, it was a public institute named Textile Institute and Development Center (TIDC). It is the first and only public–private partnership (PPP) educational institution in Bangladesh.

Diploma in textile institutes (public)

A bunch of state funded diploma institutes under the authority of Bangladesh Technical Education Board and with compliance to the order of the Institution of Textile Engineers and Technologists (ITET) are operating in Bangladesh at present. Several more are still on the ongoing process of parliamentary approval.

These are —

Bangladesh Handloom Education & Training Institute, Narshingdi
Barishal Textile Institute, Barishal
Khulna Textile Institute, Khulna
Tangail Textile Institute, Tangail
Natore Textile Institute, Natore
Rangpur Textile Institute, Rangpur
Chattogram Textile Institute, Chattagram
Dinajpur Textile Institute, Dinajpur
Gourandi Textile Institute, Barishal (Ongoing Project)
Bhola Textile Institute, Bhola (Ongoing Project)
Sheikh Rasel Textile Institute, Madargonj, Jamalpur (Ongoing Project)
Shaheed Kamrujjaman Textile Institute, Manda, Nawgaon (Ongoing Project)
Begum Amina Mansur Textile Engineering Institute, Kazipur, Sirajgonj (Ongoing Project)
Sunamganj Textile Institute, Sunamganj (Ongoing Project)
Faridpur Textile Institute, Faridpur (Ongoing Project)
Sylhet Textile Institute, Sylhet (Ongoing Project)
Lalmonirhat Textile Institute, Lalmonirhat (Ongoing Project)
Feni Textile Institute, Feni (Waiting for Govt. Approval)
Shahrasti Textile Institute, Chandpur (Waiting for Govt. Approval)
Narayangonj Textile Institute, Narayangonj (Project in Process)
Netrokona Textile Institute, Netrokona (Project in Process)
Jashore Textile Institute, Jashore (Project in Process)
Joypurhat Textile Institute, Joypurhat (Project in Process)
Mahbubul Haq Shakil Textile Institute, Mymensingh (Project in Process)
Kushtia Textile Institute, Kushtia (Project in Process)
Sherpur Textile Institute, Sherpur (Project in Process)

Private universities offering textile courses

Ahsanullah University of Science and Technology
Anwar Khan Modern University
Atish Dipankar University of Science and Technology
Bangladesh University of Business and Technology
BGMEA University of Fashion & Technology
Central University of Science and Technology
City University, Bangladesh
Daffodil International University
European University of Bangladesh
Fareast International University
Green University of Bangladesh
Khwaja Yunus Ali University
Northern University, Bangladesh
Port City International University
Primeasia University
Rajshahi Science & Technology University
Shanto-Mariam University of Creative Technology
Shyamoli Textile Engineering College
Sonargaon University
Southeast University, Bangladesh
The International University of Scholars
The People's University of Bangladesh
University of South Asia
Chattogram University of Creative Technology
Uttara University
Victoria University of Bangladesh
World University of Bangladesh

Private polytechnic offering diploma in textile courses

 Shyamoli Ideal Polytechnic Institute
 Daffodil Polytechnic Institute
 Mangrove Institute of Science and Technology
 Bangladesh Institute of Information Technology
 Haji Abul Hossain Institute of Technology
 National Institute of Technology, Chattogram
 Ahsanullah Institute of Technical and Vocational Education, Dhaka
 Mirpur Polytechnic Institute, Mirpur, Dhaka
 National Institute of Engineering and Technology
 Bangladesh Polytechnic Institute
 City Textile Engineering Institute
 Bangladesh Institute of Technology
 National Polytechnic Institute, Dhaka
 National Polytechnic College, Chittagong
 Bangladesh Textile Engineering College
 Progressive Polytechnic Institute
 Sirajganj Ideal Textile Engineering Institute (SITEI), Sirajganj
 Sirajganj Institute of Textile Engineering and Technology (SITET), Sirajganj
 Gaibandha Institute of Engineering and Technology (GIET), Gaibandha

Private institutes offering textile courses 
Apparel Institute of Fashion and Technology, affiliated with National University.
Bangladesh Institute of Business and Technology, affiliated with National University.
BCMC College of Engineering & Technology, affiliated with University of Rajshahi.
BGIFT Institute of Science and Technology, affiliated with National University.
Chattogram BGMEA Institute of Fashion and Technology, affiliated with National University.
Chattogram Institute of Engineering and Technology, affiliated with University of Chittagong.
Chattogram Institute of Fashion and Technology, affiliated with University of Chittagong.
College of Fashion Technology and Management, affiliated with National University.
Dhaka Institute of Fashion and Technology, affiliated with National University.
Ideal Technical Training Center, operated by Bangladesh Technical Education Board.
Inspiration Institute of Design and Technology, affiliated with National University.
Institute of Science, Trade and Technology, affiliated with National University.
National Institute of Design, affiliated with National University.
National Institute of Fashion Technology, affiliated with National University.
Newcastle University College, affiliated with University of Chittagong.
Professional Institute of Science and Fashion Technology, affiliated with National University.
Sikder College of Textile and Fashion Technology, affiliated with National University.
Shyamoli Textile Engineering College, affiliated with University of Dhaka.
TMSS Engineering College, affiliated with University of Rajshahi.
Ideal Textile Institute, operated by Bangladesh Technical Education Board.

Textile vocational institutes
Currently, there are a total of 41 textile vocational institutes throughout Bangladesh under the Department of Textiles, government of the People's Republic of Bangladesh. The department is planning to set up 12 more textile vocational institutes in the coming years.

References

External links
www.butex.edu.bd
www.dot.gov.bd

 
Lists of universities and colleges in Bangladesh